Italian submarine Dagabur was an  built for the Royal Italian Navy (Regia Marina) during the 1930s. It was named after a town of Dagabur in eastern Ethiopia. The submarine played a minor role in the Spanish Civil War of 1936–1939 supporting the Spanish Nationalists. On August 11, 1942, during World War II, Dagabur was rammed by destroyer  and sank with all hands.

Design and description
The Adua-class submarines were essentially repeats of the preceding . They displaced  surfaced and  submerged.

For surface running, the boats were powered by two  diesel engines, each driving one propeller shaft. When submerged each propeller was driven by a  electric motor. They could reach  on the surface and  underwater.

The boats were armed with six internal  torpedo tubes, four in the bow and two in the stern. One reload torpedo was carried for each tube, for a total of twelve. They were also armed with one  deck gun for combat on the surface. The light anti-aircraft armament consisted of one or two pairs of   machine guns.

Construction and career

Dagabur was built at the Tosi shipyard in Taranto. She was laid down on 16 April 1936, launched on 22 November of the same year, and commissioned on 9 April 1937. On April 25, 1937, she was assigned to 43rd Submarine Squadron in Taranto. During 1937 she carried out training and exercises in the Dodecanese and Libya. Between August and September of 1937 she performed three missions during the Spanish Civil War. During the first one, on August 13, 1937 Dagabur unsuccessfully attacked a ship during a patrol in the Aegean Sea. In 1938 she was reassigned to Tobruk, and in 1940 she returned to Italy, and was assigned to 46th Squadron (IV Submarine Group) based first at Taranto and then at Augusta.

After Italy's entrance into World War II, Dagabur under command of captain Domenico Romano, was engaged in various defensive missions, mainly anti-submarine, in the Gulf of Taranto and off the coasts of Tunisia and Libya. She did not encounter any enemy units during these missions.

On January 1, 1941 Dagabur commenced her patrol off Cyrenaica coast lasting until January 12, but it proved to be uneventful.

On February 19, 1941, she unsuccessfully patrolled off Malta.

On March 29, 1941, Dagabur along with two other submarines, was sent to patrol between Alexandria and Cape Krio. These three submarines were a part of the screening force covering main Italian battle formation involved in the Operation "Gaudo". At 20:27 on March 30 Dagabur sighted in the position  light cruiser  escorting, along with three destroyers, two transports. Being in ideal position for attack, at 20:37 she launched two torpedoes, and heard two strong explosions. There were no news of the result of this attack and it's likely the cruiser was damaged, but hours later,  was torpedoed again, this time, by the submarine Ambra and sunk with a loss of 23 officers and 115 other members of the crew.

On December 14, 1941 Dagabur, now under command of captain Alberto Torri, intercepted while surfaced, and launched two torpedoes at an unknown unit, and immediately disengaging by diving. From the British documentation, it was later learned that the unit attacked was British submarine Talisman, which did not sustain any damage and it reacted with the launch of two torpedoes and deck gun fire, but also with no results.

At the beginning of August 1942 Dagabur, now under command of captain Renato Pecori, left Cagliari and was sent to patrol an area between Ibiza and Mallorca and northern coast of Algeria. On August 10, 1942, she was ordered to report sightings of enemy units, but not attack any ships until after the start of the British Operation "Pedestal". On August 11, 1942, she sighted British Force, part of Operation "Bellows", including British aircraft carrier  and eight destroyers south of the Balearic Islands. Dagabur attempted to maneuver into approach on the surface but was spotted and attacked and rammed by destroyer  and sank with all hands in the position  on August 12.  was also damaged in the collision, and had to be escorted back to Gibraltar for repairs.

Notes

References
 

Adua-class submarines
World War II submarines of Italy
Lost submarines of Italy
Maritime incidents in August 1942
World War II shipwrecks in the Mediterranean Sea
1936 ships
Ships built by Cantieri navali Tosi di Taranto
Ships built in Taranto
Ships lost with all hands
Submarines sunk by British warships